This is a list of the Sites of Special Scientific Interest (SSSIs) in the Isle of Anglesey Area of Search (AoS).

Sites

References

Isle of Anglesey
Isle of Anglesey